The 2015 William & Mary Tribe football team represented the College of William & Mary as a member of the Colonial Athletic Association (CAA)in the 2015 NCAA Division I FCS football season. The Tribe were led by 36th-year head coach Jimmye Laycock played their home games at Zable Stadium. They were members. William & Mary returned to an 11-game regular season schedule after playing 12 games the previous two seasons. The Tribe shared the CAA title with James Madison and Richmond; all three teams finished with identical 6–2 conference records. William & Mary received an at-large bid to the FCS playoffs, where they defeated Duquesne in the first round before losing in the second round to Richmond.

Following the 2015 season, Zable Stadium underwent a significant renovation and expansion.

Schedule

Ranking movements

References

William and Mary
William & Mary Tribe football seasons
Colonial Athletic Association football champion seasons
William and Mary
William and Mary Tribe football